Il merito delle donne, most commonly translated The Worth of Women: Wherein is Clearly Revealed Their Nobility and Their Superiority to Men, is a dialogue by Moderata Fonte first published posthumously in 1600. The work is a dialogue between seven Venetian women discussing the worth of women and the differences between the sexes more generally. The title has also been translated The Merits of Women.

Plot 
The Worth of Women depicts a dialogue between seven Venetian noblewomen over the course of two days. On the first day, the women debate whether men are good or bad and also discuss the dignity of women. On the second day, they discuss an overview of general knowledge of natural history and culture but also return to their discussion of the sexes. Both days also contain critiques and discussions of marriage and dowries.

Characters 
Adriana - an old widow

Virginia - young and unmarried, Adriana's daughter

Leonora - a young widow

Lucretia - an older married woman

Cornelia - a young, married woman

Corinna - a young "dimmessa"

Helena - a young woman, recently married

Development 
According to Fonte's biographer, Fonte completed The Worth of Women just before her death in 1592. One of Fonte's daughters claimed that Fonte finished The Worth of Women "the very day before her death in childbirth".

The Worth of Women was highly influenced by The Decameron, a work that Fonte often alludes to in the text. Fonte's work also quotes directly and indirectly from both Petrarch's "Sonnet 263" and Orlando Furioso. The dialogue style of Fonte's work was influenced by Baldassare Castiglione and Pietro Bembo.

Virginia Cox claims that the work was influenced by the changing economy of Italy in the late sixteenth-century. This period was characterized by a reduction in marriage prospects for Venetian noble women leading to an increase in the numbers of women entering convents. However, this increase in the number of women in convents meant that it became increasingly expensive for women to become nuns. Many families were then unable to send their unwed daughters to convents which led to what Cox describes as the introduction of the "virtually unprecedented figure of the secular spinster". Cox argues that these unprecedented numbers of spinsters and nuns forced women in late sixteenth-century Venice to become more aware of their vulnerability and powerlessness and thus influenced Fonte's arguments surrounding women's dowries in The Worth of Women.

Publication history 
The Worth of Women was first published in 1600. The first edition was prefaced by a biography of Fonte written by Giovanni Nicolò Doglioni. It is unclear what, if any, changes Doglioni made to the text before its publication. The text was accompanied by a dedication from Fonte's daughter, Cecilia Zorzi, to Livia della Rovera who was 14 at the time of publication. The book received a second printing in 1603.

Virginia Cox's English translation of Il merito della donne, The Worth of Women, was first published by the University of Chicago Press in 1997 as part of their Other Voice in Early Modern Europe series. In 2018, the University of Chicago Press published Cox's translation under the title The Merits of Women. The 2018 edition omitted most of the scholarly footnotes and appendices published with the earlier version in an attempt to encourage a broader audience to read the text. The Merits of Women also featured a newly translated introduction from Dacia Mariani.

Analysis 
Adriana Chemello, Paola Malpezzi Prize, and Margaret King have all claimed that Corinna, of all the women in the dialogue, comes the closest to representing Fonte's own views and character.

Biblical commentary 
Amanda W. Benckhuysen describes Fonte as presenting a "pro-woman reading of Eve" in The Worth of Women.  Fonte acknowledges that man (Adam) was created before woman in Christianity, but claims that this supports the superiority of women. Eve was created as a helper to Adam, which Fonte claims demonstrates the incompleteness and inferiority of men. Fonte also sees Adam's sin as being worse than Eve's. Benckhuysen thus claims that the social hierarchy which places men above women has no basis in the Bible.

Friendship 
Carolyn James claims that Fonte's depiction of ideal friendship in The Worth of Women is Ciceronian. However, James finds that Fonte departs from Cicero in that she claims that men, rather than women, lack "amicitia", the essential virtue of friendship. Unlike her contemporaries, Fonte presents friendship as a female phenomenon.

Reception 
The Worth of Women is seen as a part of the Renaissance 'querelle des femmes'.

Adaptations 
Kairos Italy Theater's adaptation of The Worth of Women made its United States' premiere in spring 2017 as part of Carnegie Hall's "La Serenissima" festival. The text was translated by Virginia Cox and the production was directed by Jay Stern in collaboration with Laura Caparrotti. The show featured music by composer Erato Kremmyda and lyricist Maggie-Kate Coleman. The cast was Carlotta Brentan, Laura Caparrotti, Tali Custer, Aileen Lanni, Marta Mondelli, Irene Turri, and Annie Watkins. In October 2019, KIT-Kairos Italy Theater re-staged their adaptation.

Notes

References 

1600 books
Books about women
Books about men
Italian books
Italian-language books
Books adapted into plays
Books published posthumously